Nili Drori (born 7 August 1960) is an Israeli fencer. She competed in the women's individual foil events at the 1976, and 1984 Summer Olympics.  At the 1976 Summer Olympics, at the age of 15, she went 2-3 in Round One (defeating Mahvash Shafaie of Iran and Maria Collino of Italy -- who won the silver medal), and 1-4 in Round Two (defeating Carola Mangiarotti of Italy). At the 1984 Summer Olympics at the age of 23, she went 3-3 in Round One (defeating Miyuki Maekawa of Japan, Vincent Bradford of the United States, and María Alicia Sinigaglia of Argentina), 3-1 in the quarterfinals (defeating Jana Angelakis of the United States, Marcela Moldovan-Zsak of Romania, and Sabine Bischoff of West Germany), and 1-4 in the semifinals (defeating Debra Waples of the United States).

Her daughter İrem Karamete competed for Turkey in foil in the 2016 Summer Olympics. Her husband, Mehmet Karamete, whom she married in 1985, coached both the Israeli and the German national fencing teams.

References

External links
 

1960 births
Living people
Israeli female foil fencers
Olympic fencers of Israel
Fencers at the 1976 Summer Olympics
Fencers at the 1984 Summer Olympics
Asian Games medalists in fencing
Fencers at the 1974 Asian Games
Asian Games bronze medalists for Israel
Medalists at the 1974 Asian Games
Immigrants to Turkey